Thomas Schreiner may refer to:

 Thomas R. Schreiner (born 1954), American biblical scholar
 Thomas Schreiner (basketball) (born 1987), Austrian basketball player